Battle of Bucaramanga may refer to:

 Battle of Bucaramanga (1854)
 Battle of Bucaramanga (1899)